Ana Vázquez can refer to:

 Ana Paula Vázquez
 Ana María Vázquez Hoys